Kanae Meguro (born 9 September 1978) is a Japanese biathlete. She competed in three events at the 2006 Winter Olympics.

References

1978 births
Living people
Biathletes at the 2006 Winter Olympics
Japanese female biathletes
Olympic biathletes of Japan
Place of birth missing (living people)